XHPLPM-FM is a radio station on 96.1 FM in La Piedad, Michoacán. It is owned by Grupo Radiofónico ZER and known as El Kuino FM with a Regional Mexican format.

History
XHPLPM was awarded in the IFT-4 radio auction of 2017. The initial winning bidder, Tecnoradio, paid 15.5 million pesos for the frequency, but was later disqualified nationwide. Rodríguez Reyes, the third-place bidder, had signed up to be eligible to win stations if other bidders were disqualified and came away with the La Piedad station for 9.5 million pesos. The station came to air in December 2019.

References

Radio stations in Michoacán
Radio stations established in 2019
2019 establishments in Mexico